The Stanford Cardinal football team competes as part of the NCAA Division I Football Bowl Subdivision (FBS), representing Stanford University in the North Division of the Pac-12 Conference. Prior to 1930, the team had no official nickname. From 1930 to 1972, the team was known as the Indians; from 1972 to 1981, the team was known as the Cardinals; since 1982, the team has competed as the Cardinal.

Since the establishment of the team in 1892, Stanford has appeared in 30 bowl games.  Included in these games are 15 appearances in the Rose Bowl Game and six Bowl Championship Series (BCS)/New Year's Six game appearances with an overall record of 15 wins, 14 losses, and one tie.

Bowl games

References

Stanford Cardinal

Cardinal bowl games
Stanford Cardinal bowl games